Oxyptilus epidectis is a moth of the family Pterophoridae, that is known from Mauritius, India, Myanmar and Sri Lanka.

The larvae have been recorded feeding on Biophytum sensitivum.

References

Oxyptilini
Moths described in 1908
Plume moths of Africa
Plume moths of Asia
Moths of Mauritius
Moths of Sri Lanka